Delacour's marmoset rat (Hapalomys delacouri), also known as the lesser marmoset rat, is an arboreal species of rodent in the family Muridae. It is found in China, Laos, and Vietnam. Its natural habitat is montane subtropical or tropical dry forest at elevations from 1200 to 1500 m. It is threatened by habitat loss.

References
Citations

Sources

External link
 

Hapalomys
Mammals of Asia
Mammals described in 1927
Taxa named by Oldfield Thomas
Taxonomy articles created by Polbot